The Electoral district of Glamorgan was a single-member electoral district of the Tasmanian House of Assembly. It centred on the town of Swansea in eastern Tasmania, and included Bicheno, Little Swanport and the Freycinet Peninsula. After 1886, the seat extended as far south as Triabunna and Buckland, which had previously been in neighbouring Sorell.

The seat was created ahead of the Assembly's first election held in 1856, and was abolished at the 1903 election, when it was abolished and divided between Cambria to the north, and Sorell to the south.

Members for Glamorgan

References
 
 
 Parliament of Tasmania (2006). The Parliament of Tasmania from 1956

Glamorgan
1856 establishments in Australia